Avolar Aerolíneas, S.A. de C.V. (sensational spelling of "a volar", roughly meaning "Let's fly") was a low-cost airline based  in Tijuana, Baja California, Mexico, with corporate offices in Tijuana. The airline operated a domestic network of 17 cities as of October 2008. Avolar's main base was located at the sole large-hangar facility at the General Abelardo L. Rodríguez International Airport in Tijuana. The airline's slogan was "La aerolinea de la gente", meaning "The airline of the people".

History
Avolar began operations on 7 September 2005 with a single Boeing 737-500 aircraft.

On August 4, 2008, the Mexican Ministry of Communications and Transports suspended all Avolar operations due to tax debts, leaving thousands stranded at Tijuana Airport. Four days later, the airline resumed all flights.

On the night of October 3, 2008, Mexico's aviation authorities again suspended Avolar operations; the airline canceled flights from Tijuana International Airport that were bound for Guadalajara and Cuernavaca at that time without any previous warning, leaving 160 passengers stranded at the airport. However, 13 hours later, on October 4, the airline resumed all services normally.

On October 28, 2008, the Secretaria de Comunicaciones y Transportes (SCT), Mexico's Communications and Transports Secretariat, finally barred Avolar from all operations, due to the illegal operations of the airline after its airspace operative concession had expired the previous day, leaving employees with no compensation.

Destinations 
Avolar operated to the following destinations within Mexico:

 Acapulco
 Aguascalientes
 Colima
 Cuernavaca
 Culiacán
 Durango
 Guadalajara
 Hermosillo
 La Paz
 León
 Los Mochis
 Morelia
 Puebla
 Querétaro City
 Tapachula
 Tepic
 Tijuana 
 Toluca
 Uruapan
 Zacatecas
 Zihuatanejo

Fleet
As of November 2008, the Avolar fleet included the following aircraft:

5 Boeing 737-300
3 Boeing 737-500

Retired fleet
2 Boeing 737-200

References

Defunct airlines of Mexico
Defunct low-cost airlines
Airlines established in 2005
Airlines disestablished in 2008
Companies based in Tijuana